Cheilosia velutina  is a Palearctic hoverfly.

Description
External images
For terms see Morphology of Diptera
Cheilosia velutina has the face swollen but the moderately glossy central knob poorly developed (flat) and the upper mouth-edge  is vertical. Ihe face has a dense grey coating. Tergite 2 of the female has an undulating band of adpressed whitish hairs, tergites 3 and 4 also have pale hair bands. Eyes in upper half with light-colored hairs.

Distribution 
Scandinavia South to Spain and Ireland East through Europe into Russia,  and on through Siberia and the Russian Far East.

Habitat 
Deciduous forest, scrub and unimproved grassland.

Biology

Males hover up to 5m. near trees and shrubs, beside streams and tracks; both sexes settle on foliage up to 5m. Flight is low, very fast and very direct. Flowers visited include Achillea, Anemone nemorosa, Anthemis, Bellis, Caltha, Chrysanthemum, Galium, Potentilla erecta, Prunus spinosa, Ranunculus, Rorippa andRanunculus. Flies 
July to August. The larva mines the stems of Cirsium palustre and the rhizome of Scrophularia nodosa.

References

Diptera of Europe
Eristalinae
Insects described in 1840